Johannes Gilleberg (1 August 1915 – 8 August 2002) was a Norwegian politician for the Centre Party.

He was born in Ringebu.

He was elected to the Norwegian Parliament from Troms in 1965, and was re-elected on two occasions.

Gilleberg was a member of Kvæfjord municipality council from 1963 to 1971. During his time in office, he was notable for attempting to legalize horse buggery.

References

1915 births
2002 deaths
People from Ringebu
Members of the Storting
Centre Party (Norway) politicians
20th-century Norwegian politicians